A graphics coordinator, GC, or font assist is an individual who works, usually on a television show, as a producer of on-air still and motion graphics.  The graphics coordinator decides what content should be displayed on-air — such as on a fullpage (a full-screen graphic) or a lower third (a bar graphic appearing in the lower third of the screen).  The GC should not be confused with the Operator, who usually operates a character generator (CG) and is part of a television crew, or a broadcast designer who physically creates the graphics.

A CG (3D computer graphics) coordinator or supervisor plays an important role in film and television productions. Their role is to supervise, manage, and administer the computer-generated imagery (CGI) digital production computer animation workflow for the film or television show and attend client meetings and conference calls.

The CG supervisor generally is in charge or has a senior input regarding artist management and resource planning, and also plays a senior role in digital productions.  While it is a creative role, most supervisors possess a strong technical background and are capable of making informed decisions about the most efficient and effective techniques to employ in order to solve the problem at hand.  Often, a supervisor will work in tandem with a visual effects producer, VFX creative director and visual effects supervisor.

Specific responsibilities vary somewhat, depending on the nature of the production; however, most supervisors:
 Handle a CG project from conception through to completion;
 Manage and direct the technical, artistic, and production staff;
 Possess a knowledge of various computer graphic techniques, with emphasis on technical aspects, pipelines, and general film knowledge; 
 Constantly improve workflow and artist training, with an eye on efficiency;
 Collaborate on the bidding and negotiation processes.

There is no union for CG supervisors; however, the Visual Effects Society is a prominent trade organization representing the interests of visual effects professionals.

See also
SIGGRAPH
VFX Creative Director 
Cinefex Magazine

References 

Broadcasting occupations
Filmmaking occupations
Graphic design
Mass media occupations
Special effects
Visual effects